Guaycará is a district of the Golfito canton, in the Puntarenas province of Costa Rica.

History 
Guaycará was created on 26 November 1971 by Decreto Ejecutivo 2074-G .

Geography 
Guaycará has an area of  km² and an elevation of  metres.

Locations
The entrance to the Piedras Blancas National Park is in the village of La Gamba in this district.

Demographics 

For the 2011 census, Guaycará had a population of  inhabitants.

Transportation

Road transportation 
The district is covered by the following road routes:
 National Route 2
 National Route 14

References 

Districts of Puntarenas Province
Populated places in Puntarenas Province